, also known as simply Cross Ange, is a Japanese mecha anime television series produced by Sunrise that aired from October 2014 to March 2015. A manga adaptation began publication in August 2014.

Plot

Through the development of groundbreaking information transfer and material generation technology called "Mana", various problems, such as pollution and war have disappeared, and days of peace have arrived in the world. However, the people who receive the benefit of the Mana live in a false peace. Those who cannot use the Mana, referred to by the derogatory term "Norma", who are seen as an opposition to the structures of society, live in oppression. Because this is the norm, the people who use Mana do not question it. 

The first princess of the Misurugi Empire, Angelise Ikaruga Misurugi, was convinced of the belief of exterminating the Norma. But on the day she turned 16, and was baptised, her elder brother, Julio, exposed her as a Norma to the public. Angelise, bewildered by the revelation that she herself was a Norma all along, turns into a target of hate by the people in the blink of an eye and is exiled to Arzenal, an isolated military base where Norma are conscripted into service against their will to fight interdimensional creatures known as DRAGONs, and starts her new life as the Norma soldier named Ange. 

As she struggles to adjust to her new identity, Ange's now stormy life takes one surprising turn after another as she embarks on a personal quest to correct the world she lives in, all while learning there may be a bigger conspiracy involving the DRAGONs, the world she lives in, and mana itself.

Media

Manga
A manga adaptation drawn by Kenjirō Takeshita was published between August 3, 2014 and June 28, 2015 on Kadokawa Shoten's ComicWalker website and collected in three volumes.

A light-hearted high-school-themed 4koma parody manga Cross Ange: Academy of Angels and Dragons drawn by Osaji was published on ComicWalker between October 5, 2014 and March 29, 2015. Each strip followed an anime episode. The manga was compiled in two volumes.

Anime

The anime series is produced by Sunrise and aired between October 5, 2014 and March 29, 2015 on Tokyo MX, MBS, TVA, BS11. The insert song featured in episodes five, nine, and twenty-two is "Necessary" by Mizuki.

The series was licensed by Sentai Filmworks for a digital and home media release in North America. Madman Entertainment also licensed the series for streaming in Australia and New Zealand. The series was picked up by Crunchyroll for streaming in North America and other select parts of the world.

Video games
An action shooter game for the PlayStation Vita titled Cross Ange: Rondo of Angels and Dragons tr. was released on May 28, 2015. The player character is Naomi, who died in the original anime series before Ange arrives in Arzenal. The game features multiple endings depending on player choices. Cross Ange was included in the crossover games Super Robot Wars V and Super Robot Wars X.

Notes

References

External links
  
 
 Manga profile at Comic Walker
 

Anime with original screenplays
Mecha anime and manga
Shōnen manga
Sentai Filmworks
Sunrise (company)
Bandai Namco franchises
PlayStation Vita games
PlayStation Vita-only games
Tokyo MX original programming
Japanese LGBT-related animated television series
2015 Japanese television series endings
2015 video games
2015 comics endings